The 2009–10 Duleep Trophy was the 49th season of the Duleep Trophy, a first-class cricket tournament contested by five zonal teams of India: Central Zone, East Zone, North Zone, South Zone and West Zone.

West Zone won the title, defeating South Zone in the final. West Zone made the highest successful chase in first-class cricket to win the trophy.

Results

Final

References

External links
Series home at ESPN Cricinfo

Duleep Trophy seasons
Duleep Trophy
Duleep Trophy